Unione Calcio Sampdoria colloquially known as Sampdoria Women, is the women's team of U.C. Sampdoria.

History 
After starting its activity at youth levels, the team was granted the access to play the women's  (fourth tier of Italian women's football). In their first season, Sampdoria were in the second position and lost the final of the promotion-play offs. The club was established on 15 June 2021 by acquiring the sports title of a San Gimignano-based team Florentia San Gimignano S.S.D. playing in Serie A. On 7 July 2021, Antonio Cincotta was hired as team coach. Sampdoria's first Serie A match was on 29 August when they won 2–1 against Lazio,  Ana Lucía Martínez e Yoreli Rincón were the first two goalscorer of Sampdoria's history. The first Sampdoria president was Massimo Ferrero. However, after his arrest in December 2021, Marco Lanna became the new president of the company.

Managerial history
Below is a list of Sampdoria Women coaches from 2020 until the present day.

Presidential history
Below is a list of Sampdoria Women presidents from 2020 until the present day.

Players

Current squad

See also 
 List of women's football clubs in Italy

References 

2021 establishments in Italy
Association football clubs established in 2021
Women's football clubs in Italy
Football clubs in Genoa
Serie A (women's football) clubs
U.C. Sampdoria
U.C. Sampdoria (women)